Acacia argyrodendron, known colloquially as  black gidyea or blackwood, is a species of Acacia native to Australia. Czech botanist Karel Domin described this species in 1926 and it still bears its original name. Domin reported collecting the type specimen from somewhere between Camooweal and Burketown in northwestern Queensland, though it is more likely to have been northeast of Aramac.

Description
Like most species of Acacia it has phyllodes rather than true leaves. The ascending and evergreen phyllodes have a narrowly linear-elliptic shape and are straight or sometimes a little recurved.

Taxonomy
The species was first formally described by the botanist Karel Domin in 1926 as part of the work Beitrage zur Flora und Pflanzengeographie Australiens as published in the work Bibliotheca Botanica. It was reclassified as Racosperma argyrodendron in 1987 by Leslie Pedley then transferred back to genus Acacia in 2001.

It forms open forests as the dominant (and sometimes only) tree species. Associated understory plants include shrub species such as the false sandalwood (Eremophila mitchellii), yellow-wood (Terminalia oblongata) and conkerberry (Carissa spinarum), and smaller herbaceous plants such as brigalow grass (Paspalidium caespitosum), yakka grass (Sporobolus caroli), blue trumpet (Brunoniella australis) and Dipteracanthus australasicus. Occasionally, there may be trees such as Dawson River blackbutt (Eucalyptus cambageana), coolibah (E. coolabah) and Brown's box (E. brownii).

Gidgee (A. cambagei)  replaces it in drier habitats, while brigalow (Acacia harpophylla) replaces it in wetter areas, as well as overlapping for part of the southern and eastern parts of its range.

It has been recorded as a host plant for the mistletoe species Amyema preissii, Amyema quandang and Lysiana exocarpi''.

See also
List of Acacia species

References

argyrodendron
Fabales of Australia
Flora of New South Wales
Flora of Queensland
Plants described in 1926
Taxa named by Karel Domin